Jan Håkan Funk (born 30 September 1962 in Falun) is a Swedish curler.

He participated in the demonstration curling events at the 1992 Winter Olympics, where the Swedish team finished in fifth place. He also competed for Sweden at two .

Teams

References

External links

Living people
1962 births
People from Falun
Swedish male curlers
Curlers at the 1992 Winter Olympics
Olympic curlers of Sweden